Washington Township is one of thirteen townships in Parke County, Indiana, United States. As of the 2010 census, its population was 1,302 and it contained 457 housing units.

History
The Sanitorium Covered Bridge was listed on the National Register of Historic Places in 1978.

Geography

Cities, towns, villages
 Marshall

Unincorporated towns
 Bethany at 
 Cincinnati at 
 Judson at 
 Nyesville at 
 Pin Hook at 
(This list is based on USGS data and may include former settlements.)

Cemeteries
The township contains these seven cemeteries: Barnes, Bethany, Buchanan, Elder, Overman, Poplar and Rawlings.

Major highways
  U.S. Route 41

School districts
 Turkey Run Community School Corporation

Political districts
 State House District 44
 State Senate District 38

References
 
 United States Census Bureau 2009 TIGER/Line Shapefiles
 IndianaMap

External links
 Indiana Township Association
 United Township Association of Indiana
 City-Data.com page for Washington Township

Townships in Parke County, Indiana
Townships in Indiana